Berea is an unincorporated community and census-designated place in Box Butte County, in the northwestern part of the state of Nebraska in the Midwestern United States. It had a population of 41 at the 2010 census.

History

The Burlington Railroad reached the area of Berea in 1889, and railroad support facilities, including a water tower and section house, were built on the site. The town was founded by a group of settlers, originally from Ohio, who named their new home after Berea, Ohio.

In 1890-91, the town had a population of 50, and a general store, newspaper, and post office; five years later, a school and community hall had been added.

The population of Berea fluctuated over the next century. The town was of some local importance as a shipping stop along the railroad, although it never developed many commercial enterprises. A garage opened in 1921, repairing both automobiles and farm machinery. In 1925, when the population was estimated at 35, the post office was re-opened; it closed again a year later. A refinery was operated in the town in 1935 by the Utility Petroleum Company of Chadron.

In 1960, a population of 75 was reported for Berea. The District 39 school was closed in 2007, at which time it had nine students enrolled. In 2009, the town's population was estimated to be 50.

Geography
It lies along the west side of the BNSF Railway tracks, and of Nebraska Highway 2 near its junction with U.S. Route 385.

Demographics

Economy
Berea has no commercial district.
In 2010, West Plains Grain Inc. announced plans to build a high-speed grain-loading facility with a capacity of 126 rail cars near Berea.

References

Census-designated places in Box Butte County, Nebraska
Census-designated places in Nebraska